Qualifier 1 of the Qualifying Round of the 2017 World Baseball Classic was held at Blacktown Baseball Stadium, Sydney, Australia from February 11 to 14, 2016.

Qualifier 1 was a modified double-elimination tournament. The winners of Games 1 and 2 matched up in Game 4, while the losers faced each other in Game 3, an elimination game. The winner of the elimination game (Game 3) then played the loser of the non-elimination game (Game 4), in Game 5, another elimination game. The remaining two teams then played each other in Game 6, to determine the winners of the Qualifier 1.

Bracket

Results
All times are Australian Eastern Daylight Time (UTC+11:00).

South Africa 7, New Zealand 1

Australia 11, Philippines 1

New Zealand 17, Philippines 7

Australia 4, South Africa 1

South Africa 9, New Zealand 2

Australia 12, South Africa 5

External links
Official website

Qualifier 1
2010s in Sydney
Baseball in New South Wales
World Baseball Classic – Qualifier 1
International baseball competitions hosted by Australia
Rooty Hill, New South Wales
Sports competitions in Sydney